Must the Devil Have All the Good Tunes? is a piano concerto by the American composer John Adams. Its title is taken from a saying attributed to Martin Luther. The work was premiered on March 7, 2019 by Yuja Wang and the Los Angeles Philharmonic, conducted by Gustavo Dudamel. A recording, made by Wang, Dudamel, and the Los Angeles Philharmonic in November 2019, was released digitally by Deutsche Grammophon on April 17, 2020. The piece is Adams' third piano concerto, after Eros Piano (1989) and Century Rolls (1997).

Composition

Movements 
The piece is in three movements, played without pauses between them:

All three movements in total last about 28 minutes.

Instrumentation 
The piece is scored for the following orchestra:

Woodwinds 
Piccolo
2 Flutes (1st doubling piccolo 2)
2 Oboes
English horn
2 Clarinets in B♭ and A (2nd doubling basset horn)
Bass clarinet
2 Bassoons
Contrabassoon (doubling bassoon 3)

Brass 
4 Horns in F
2 Trumpets in C
2 Trombones (2nd doubling bass trombone)

Percussion (1 player) 
Almglocken
Bass drum
Snare drum

Pianos 
Solo piano
Honky tonk piano

Strings 
Violin I
Violin II
Violas
Cellos
Double basses
Bass guitar

References

Concertos by John Adams (composer)
2018 compositions
Piano concertos
Music commissioned by the Los Angeles Philharmonic